Kosmos 2529 ( meaning Space 2529) is a  Russian military satellite launched in 2018 as part of the GLONASS satellite navigation system.

This satellite is a GLONASS-M satellite, also known as Uragan-M, and is numbered Uragan-M No. 757.

Kosmos 2527 was launched from Site 43/4  at Plesetsk Cosmodrome in northern Russia. A Soyuz-2-1b carrier rocket with a Fregat upper stage was used to perform the launch which took place at 20:17 UTC on 3 November 2018. The launch successfully placed the satellite into a Medium Earth orbit. It subsequently received its Kosmos designation, and the international designator 2018-086A. The United States Space Command assigned it the Satellite Catalog Number 43687.

The satellite is in orbital plane 2, in orbital slot 7. As of December 2018 it remains in operation.

See also

 2018 in spaceflight
 List of Kosmos satellites (2501–2750)
 List of R-7 launches (2015–19)

References

Spacecraft launched in 2018
Spacecraft launched by Soyuz rockets
Kosmos satellites
2018 in Russia
GLONASS satellites